James Courtney Bevin was an Anglican priest in the 20th century.

He was the great great uncle of the British Labour politician Ernest Bevin.

Notes

Deans of Argyll and The Isles
1946 deaths
Year of birth missing